The Northern NSW Football State Cup was a knockout football competition which ended in 2014, being replaced by the preliminary rounds of the FFA Cup. The annual competition was organised by NNSW Football, and open to all male teams. Prior to 1959, northern NSW teams participated in the State Cup for the whole state of NSW.

Finals

Trophy
 The NNSW Football State Cup is shown here at the Broadmeadow Magic 2014 winning celebration.

References

External links

Soccer cup competitions in Australia
National association football cups
2010 establishments in Australia